Live at Paradiso is a live album by American singer-songwriter Beth Hart, released in 2005 by Universal. It was recorded at a live performance at the music venue Paradiso in Amsterdam, the Netherlands. A DVD version is also available.  The DVD contains 3 more songs. The album peaked No. 88 in the Netherlands.

Track listing

CD
"Delicious Surprise" – 4:15
"Guilty" – 4:52
"Leave the Light on" – 4:42
"Lifts You Up" – 3:59
"Broken & Ugly" – 4:48
"Get Your Shit Together" – 5:56
"Immortal" – 7:07
"Monkey Back" – 5:37
"Am I the One" – 10:44
"Mama" – 4:25
"L.A. Song" – 4:31
"World Without You" – 5:17
"Whole Lotta Love" – 7:54

DVD
"Hiding Under Water"
"Delicious Surprise"
"Guilty"
"Leave the Light on"
"Lifts You Up"
"Broken & Ugly"
"Get Your Shit Together"
"Immortal"
"Lay Your Hands on Me"
"Monkey Back"
"Am I the One"
"Mama"
"L.A. Song"
"World Without You"
"Whole Lotta Love"
Bonus tracks
"Bonus 35 Minute Rockumentary"
"World Without You" (music video) – 4:03
"I Don't Need No Doctor" (extra live song) – 9:56

Personnel
Musicians
 Beth Hart – guitar, piano, vocals
 Tom Lilly – bass guitar
 Jon Nichols – guitar
 John Nyman – drums

Production credits
Mirko Cocco – Director, Video editor, producer
 Jeroen Bos – photography
 Hans Brethouwer – editing, mastering
 Hans Bunt – digital editing, editing, engineer, mastering, mixing
 Terk DeGroot – assistant engineer
 John Franck – executive producer
 Jeff Gilligan – design, package design
 Morten Rygaard – cover photo
 Anders Terlaack – photography
 David Wolff  – executive producer
 Hay Zeelen – mastering

References

Beth Hart albums
2005 live albums